Des Barry may refer to:

 Desmond Barry (born 1954), Welsh author
 Des Barry (footballer) (born 1933), Australian rules footballer